Al-Arkam school is a school in Gaza City which was established by Hamas leader Sheikh Ahmed Yassin. In September, 2005, it was partially destroyed in an airstrike carried out by Israel in retaliation for rocket attacks launched by Palestinian militants.

External links 
  - shows the remains of the school
 

Schools in the Gaza Strip
Primary schools in the State of Palestine
High schools in the State of Palestine